Savannah Smith (born 1992) is an American All State basketball player from Dallas. She is the youngest of four children.

Biography
Savannah was born to Chris Christian (Smith) and Shanon Smith. Her father is a music producer and recording Artist (CC Entertainment), and is an owner of a WNBA Team "Tulsa Shock". Her mother Shanon graduated from Vanderbilt University in Nashville, Tennessee.

Savannah was a standout athlete at an early age playing on many championship soccer and basketball teams in Dallas, Texas including the private school "Dallas Covenant" as well as summer league basketball and soccer teams. She eventually lead Dallas Covenant to the basketball State Championships as a sophomore, was all District four consecutive years, and was awarded All State all four years of high school. Her junior year in high school she played in the National Media game between Dallas Covenant and Dallas Academy which ended in the score of 100-0. The game was referenced by Jay Leno on the "Tonight Show", the front page of the Dallas News, the pre game of the Super Bowl, ESPN's "Outside The Lines" and thousands of other media outlets.

During the summers, she played on "Team Texas" coached by Ron Gathrite her Sophomore summer and Elite California Storm her Junior summer (with Chelesa Grey - Duke) coached by George Quinteo her Junior summer.

In 2010 she signed a full basketball scholarship with Abilene Christian University. She played guard for Abilene Christian University women's basketball team which won the Lone Star Conference in the 2012-2013 season. She was presented with the Honor Roll Athlete award for her sophomore and junior year at Abilene Christian University.

Team USA
At the invitation of Jerry Colangelo (President of USA Basketball), Savannah spent the summer of 2012 in London working with basketball TEAM USA (men's and women's) in London at the Olympics where both Men and Women brought home a GOLD MEDAL.

Savannah is listed on the "Top Modern Women's Basketball Hall" and "Women's Basketball Pioneers" because of her two high school games in which she scored 48 points per game.

48 pts. Savannah Smith, Covenant High (W 70-44) North Hills, November 1, 2008 (5'7"  soph.•8 assists•6 steals)
48 pts. Savannah Smith, Covenant High (W 100-0) Dallas Academy, January 13, 2009  (5'7"  jr.•20-21 FGs•4-5 threes•2-2 FTs•8 reb.•13 stl.)

Basketball credits and awards
 First Team ALL STATE Basketball  - Freshman
 First Team ALL STATE Basketball  - Sophomore
 First Team ALL STATE Basketball  - Junior
 Fourth Year ALL STATE Basketball - Senior
 District MVP Basketball 2009
 All District Freshman Year
 All District Sophomore Year
 All District Junior Year
 All District Senior Year
 Top 5 scorer in Texas in 2008 per MaxPreps
 Top 12 scorer in Nation in 2008 per MaxPreps
 MVP Alvin, Texas Basketball Invitational
 All Star - A & M Elite Basketball Camp
 All Tournament - Hill Country Basketball Invitational
 All Tournament - Highland Park Invitational

Dallas Covenant School Basketball Championships

 District Champions 06-07
 Regional Champions 06-07
 District Champions 07-08
 Regional Champions 07-08

Final Four State Championships 2008

 District Champions 08-09
 Regional Champions 08-09
 Area Champions 08-09

High School Track
Savannah is a Five Time State Track Champion for High Jump, Long Jump, 220, and 4X220 relay.

Currently holds the All Time State Record for Tapps High Jump.

References

External links

mydd.com

1992 births
People from Dallas
Living people
Basketball players from Texas